The Brecon Beacons Food Festival is an annual food festival that was established in 1998. The festival is held during October in Brecon, a town which is located in the Brecon Beacons National Park.

Overview

The Brecon Beacons Food Festival attracts around 70 stalls selling food and drink and is considered to be a key local event. The festival is timed to coincide with the local harvest season and aims to promote the town of Brecon, promote local food and drink producers and raise awareness of the local farming industry and the type of produce available in the Brecon Beacons and surrounding area.

Focus

The festival focus is mainly on food and drink with live cookery demonstrations by chefs, as well as cookery presentations and culinary crafts.

There is also music and other forms of entertainment, including talks, demonstrations, educational activities, and activities for children. 

Celebrity guests have included the S4C television chef Nerys Howel, the weather presenters Derek Brockway, Sue Charles, and Ruth Wignall, the Welsh television presenter and naturalist Iolo Williams and Colin Grey, Captain of the Welsh Olympic Chefs Team.

Structure and support

The festival is a nonprofit organisation and surplus revenue is reinvested into the festival. The festival has a number of sponsors, including Castell Howell and Brecon Chamber of Trade and Commerce and has been supported by Welsh Government through the Food Festival Grant Scheme. The festival has also sought to raise funds through GoFundMe.

Location

The festival is held indoors in the Market Hall in Brecon and has around 10,000 visitors. There is no entry fee.

Further reading

Business Wales, Food and Drink

About Wales, Welsh Food Festivals

References 

Food and drink festivals in the United Kingdom
Ceredigion
Annual events in Wales
1998 establishments in Wales
Recurring events established in 1998
Autumn events in Wales